Les cinq codes was a set of legal codes established under Napoléon I between 1804 and 1810:

 Code civil (1804), the first and best known
 Code de procédure civile (1806)
 Code de commerce (1807)
 Code d’instruction criminelle (1808)
 Code pénal (1810)

Law of France